The Struggle may refer to:
The Struggle (political organization), a Marxist political organization in Pakistan

Music
 The Struggle (Tenth Avenue North album), 2012
 The Struggle (Cappadonna album), 2003
 "The Struggle", a hidden track by 30 Seconds to Mars from the self-titled debut album
 "The Struggle", a song by Eddy Grant from Reparation
 "The Struggle", a song by Scroobius Pip on Distraction Pieces
 "The Struggle", a song by Tove Lo from Blue Lips

Film
 The Struggle, D. W. Griffith's final film, 1931

See also
 Struggle (disambiguation)